WPLY (610 kHz) is a commercial AM radio station licensed to Roanoke, Virginia, and serving Southwest Virginia and the New River Valley.  WPLY simulcasts a sports radio format with WPLI 1390 AM in Lynchburg.  Both stations are owned and operated by Mel Wheeler, Inc.  Most programming is supplied by Fox Sports Radio.

By day, WPLY is powered at 5,000 watts.  But at night, when radio waves travel farther, it reduces power to 1,000 watts to protect other stations on 610 AM.  WPLY has a directional antenna, using a five-tower array.  The transmitter is at the end of Newman Drive in Salem.  Programming is also heard on 175 watt FM translator W266CY at 101.1 MHz in Roanoke.

History

WSLC Country
The original call sign was WSLS. During the "Golden Age of Radio," the station carried programs from the NBC Blue Network, dramas, comedies, news, sports, soap operas, game shows and big band broadcasts. (The Blue Network later became ABC.) A partner FM station, 99.1 WSLS-FM, launched in 1947, largely simulcasting the AM station. WSLS-TV followed five years later on Channel 10.

As network programming moved from radio to television, 610 WSLS switched to a full service, Country music format. In 1969, Park Communications purchased WSLS-AM-FM-TV. Due to FCC ownership restrictions, Park kept the television station and sold the radio stations to Bass Brothers Telecasters. As the stations could no longer share a call sign after the purchase, the AM became WSLC at midnight on August 1, 1972, keeping its country sound.  The FM switched to album-oriented rock and briefly became WSLC-FM before settling on current call sign WSLQ. Only the TV station still carries the original call letters. Mel Wheeler purchased the two stations in 1976.

Urban AC and Sports
At noon on May 25, 2000, WSLC began simulcasting with its new sister station 94.9 WSLC-FM, formerly easy listening turned classic rock station WPVR, after that station was purchased by Mel Wheeler Inc. This continued until March 13, 2002, when the country format moved full-time to WSLC-FM.  610 WSLC was flipped to new call letters as WVBE, simulcasting co-owned 100.1 WVBE-FM Lynchburg, and brought urban adult contemporary and R&B music full-time to Roanoke.

On January 20, 2016, the station dropped its Urban AC format for sports talk with the new call sign WPLY. The station became an affiliate of Fox Sports Radio.

References

External links
WPLY Online
WPLY Livestream

Sports radio stations in the United States
PLY (AM)
Radio stations established in 1940
1940 establishments in Virginia